The Women's freestyle 75 kg is a competition featured at the 2016 European Wrestling Championships, and was held in Riga, Latvia on March 10.

Medalists

Results
Legend
F — Won by fall

Top half

Repechage

References
Results

Women's freestyle 75 kg